Timothy Patrick Andrews (1794 – March 11, 1868) was an Irish-born, career U.S. Army officer. He served as Paymaster General of the Union Army during the American Civil War.

Personal life

Timothy Patrick Andrews was born in Ireland, the son of George and Elizabeth Andrews. Along with his father, he immigrated to the United States in 1798.

Andrews and his wife Emily Roseville Andrews children:
Richard Snowden Andrews, who fought for the Confederate States of America
Emily Andrews first wife of Colonel Charles Marshall CSA

Career
Andrews' military service began in 1814, when he served as an aid to Commodore Joshua Barney during the War of 1812. He served as a paymaster in the Army from 1822 to 1847.

During the Mexican–American War, he was put in command of the Regiment of Voltigeurs and Foot Riflemen. His second in command, Lieutenant Colonel Joseph E. Johnston would go on to become one of the most senior general officers in the Confederate States Army during the American Civil War. He was distinguished for bravery at the Battle of Molino del Rey, and was brevetted brigadier general for conspicuous gallantry at the Battle of Chapultepec, where his regiment led the assault on Chapultepec Castle.

After the Mexican War Andrews returned to the pay department of the Army, gradually rising in rank. In late 1851 Andrews was promoted to Deputy Paymaster-General and in September 1862 became Paymaster-General of the United States Army.

Andrews retired from military service on November 29, 1864.

Death
Andrews died on March 11, 1868, at the age of 75 and was interred at Rock Creek Cemetery in Washington D.C.

See also

Battle of Chapultepec
List of U.S. Army, Navy, and volunteer units in the Mexican–American War
List of American Civil War brevet generals (Union)

References

External links
 

1794 births
1868 deaths
Paymaster-General of the United States Army
United States Army colonels
Union Army colonels